The Native-speaking English Teacher (NET) Scheme came into operation in Hong Kong in 1998. It is a scheme which allows governmental and government subsidised primary and secondary schools in Hong Kong to employ English teachers from overseas. The aim of the scheme is to provide local students with exposure to authentic English language and to cultural enrichment. NET teachers are also expected to assist with teaching resources development and professional training for English teachers in their schools. At present, there are approximately 800 NET teachers in Hong Kong schools.

NET teachers are employed on a renewable two-year contract basis, they receive a gratuity at the end of each contract and also receive a special allowance which is intended to partially compensate for the additional costs of living overseas.

See also
Education in Hong Kong

External links
Native English-Speaking Teachers' Association (NESTA)
Education Bureau – Further details of NETs' terms of employment and of the rationale behind the scheme
Net Teacher Survival Guide

Education in Hong Kong
English-language education